Ponte da Pica is a bridge in Portugal. It is located in Oliveira de Azeméis, Aveiro District.

See also
List of bridges in Portugal

Bridges in Aveiro District
Oliveira de Azeméis
Properties of Public Interest in Portugal